The 1999 NCAA Division I men's ice hockey tournament involved 12 schools in playing in single-elimination play to determine the national champion of NCAA Division I. It began on March 26, 1999. The second round was on March 27 and March 28. The semifinals were on April 1. The National Championship Game was on April 3, 1999.  A total of 11 games were played, the final 3 at the Arrowhead Pond (now the Honda Center) in Anaheim, CA.  The University of Maine defeated New Hampshire by a score of 3–2 in overtime, to claim their second national championship.

Qualifying teams
The at-large bids and seeding for each team in the tournament were announced after the conference tournaments concluded on March 20, 1999.  The Central Collegiate Hockey Association (CCHA) had four teams receive a berth in the tournament, Hockey East and Western Collegiate Hockey Association (WCHA) each had three teams receive a berth in the tournament, while the ECAC had two berths.

Number in parentheses denotes overall seed in the tournament.

Game locations
 East Regional – Centrum Centre, Worcester, Massachusetts
 West Regional – Dane County Coliseum, Madison, Wisconsin
 Frozen Four – Arrowhead Pond of Anaheim, Anaheim, California

Bracket

Regionals

Frozen Four

Note: * denotes overtime period(s)

Regional Quarterfinals

East Regional

(3) Maine vs. (6) Ohio State

(4) Denver vs. (5) Michigan

West Regional

(3) Colorado College vs. (6) St. Lawrence

(4) Boston College vs. (5) Northern Michigan

Regional semifinals

East Regional

(1) New Hampshire vs. (5) Michigan

(2) Clarkson vs. (3) Maine

West Regional

(1) North Dakota vs. (4) Boston College

(2) Michigan State vs. (3) Colorado College

Frozen Four

National semifinal

(E1) New Hampshire vs. (W2) Michigan State

(E3) Maine vs. (W4) Boston College

National Championship

(E1) New Hampshire vs. (E3) Maine

All-Tournament team
G: Alfie Michaud* (Maine)
D: David Cullen (Maine)
D: Jayme Filipowicz (New Hampshire)
F: Niko Dimitrakos (Maine)
F: Jason Krog (New Hampshire)
F: Mike Souza (New Hampshire)
* Most Outstanding Player(s)

Record by conference

References

Tournament
NCAA Division I men's ice hockey tournament
NCAA Men's Division Ice Hockey Tournament
NCAA Men's Division Ice Hockey Tournament
NCAA Men's Division Ice Hockey Tournament
NCAA Men's Division Ice Hockey Tournament
NCAA Men's Division Ice Hockey Tournament
20th century in Anaheim, California
History of Worcester, Massachusetts
Ice hockey in Anaheim, California
Sports competitions in Anaheim, California
Ice hockey competitions in California
Ice hockey competitions in Wisconsin
Sports in Madison, Wisconsin
Ice hockey competitions in Worcester, Massachusetts